Chaudhary Bansi Lal University (CBLU) is a state university in the city of Bhiwani, Haryana. Established in 2014 the university offers postgraduate courses in various disciplines. CBLU is to the west of Delhi at a distance of 125 km and south of Chandigarh at a distance of 285 km. MDU Rohtak is at a distance of 52 km from CBLU. The nick name of the university is Sea-Blue.

History
Chaudhary Bansi Lal University was established by Government of Haryana in 2014 under Act 25 of 2014. The University is a State University and is recognized by the University Grants Commission (India). The University is named after Bansi Lal who was the former Chief Minister of Haryana.

Faculties
Faculty of Commerce & Management
Faculty of Education 
Faculty of Humanities
Faculty of Life Science
Faculty of Physical Science
Faculty of Social science
Faculty of Pharmaceutical Sciences
Faculty of Behavioural and Cognitive Sciences
Faculty of Earth, Environment and Space Sciences
Faculty of Engineering & Technology
Faculty of Law
Faculty of Health System
Distance Education

References

External links
 

Universities in Bhiwani
2014 establishments in Haryana
Educational institutions established in 2014
Universities in Haryana